The 2022 West Virginia House of Delegates election was held on November 8, 2022, electing all 100 members of the chamber. This coincided with the election of 17 of West Virginia's 34 state senators, and the election of West Virginia's two U.S. representatives. Primary elections were held on May 10, 2022. Due to redistricting, this was the first House of Delegates election in which all members were elected from single member districts, with West Virginia following a trend of states phasing out multi-member districts in recent decades.

Background 
In the 2020 House of Delegates election, the Republican Party gained almost twenty seats from the Democrats, achieving supermajority status. This has followed West Virginia's sharp turn towards the Republican Party in the past twenty years, and the Republicans' growing prominence in state politics. After 2020, two Democrats have changed parties, making nearly 80 percent of the chamber Republican.

Retiring incumbents

Democrats 
Five Democrats are retiring.

District 5: Dave Pethtel retired.
District 20: Nathan Brown retired to run for Mingo County Commission.
District 34: Brent Boggs retired.
District 51: Barbara Fleischauer retired to run for state senator from District 13.
District 67: John Doyle retired to run for Jefferson County Commission.

Republicans 
Nine Republicans are retiring.

District 10: John R. Kelly retired to run for state senator from District 3.
District 16: John Mandt retired to run for Cabell County Commission.
District 22: Zack Maynard retired.
District 25: Tony Paynter retired to run for Wyoming County Circuit Clerk.
District 30: Mick Bates retired to run for state senator from District 9.
District 32: Kayla Kessinger retired.
District 48: Ben Queen retired to run for state senator from District 12.
District 52: Terri Sypolt retired.
District 61: Jason Barrett retired to run for state senator from District 16.

Predictions

Speakership Election 
On August 8, 2022, Brandon Steele, a Republican from Raleigh County, announced his intent to run for Speaker against incumbent Roger Hanshaw. House Democratic leader Doug Skaff stated on the Mountain State Views podcast that he and his caucus would support Hanshaw over Steele in a speakership contest.

On December 4, 2022, Hanshaw was chosen to lead the Republican caucus for another two years, winning with 53 votes to Steele's 30. In the Democratic caucus, Skaff was re-elected as minority leader.

On January 11, 2023, the 86th Legislature convened, and the election for Speaker was held. Republican David Kelly nominated Hanshaw, who was seconded by John Hardy, and Democrat Ric Griffith nominated Skaff, who was seconded by Shawn Fluharty.

Overview

Close races
Districts where the margin of victory was under 10%:
 District 56, 1%
 District 27, 1.6%
 District 82, 2.6%
 District 50, 3.6%
 District 52, 4%
 District 24, 5.2%
 District 32, 9%
 District 75, 9%
 District 76, 9.2%
 District 5, 9.2%
 District 100, 9.6%
 District 3, 9.8%
 District 70, 7.6%

Appointments 
During West Virginia's 85th Legislature (2021-2022), several delegates resigned from their seats in the House of Delegates. According to §3-10-5 of West Virginia Code, vacancies in the House of Delegates are filled through appointment by the Governor of one of three candidates chosen by the executive committee of the outgoing member's party. Below is a list of appointments made during the 85th Legislature.

Incumbents defeated

In primaries

Democrats
District 27: Chad Lovejoy lost renomination to fellow incumbent Ric Griffith in a redistricting race.

Republicans
District 11: Roger Conley lost renomination to Bob Fehrenbacher.
District 14: Shannon Kimes lost renomination to Dave Foggin.
District 18: Johnnie Wamsley lost renomination to Jim Butler.
District 28: Josh Booth lost renomination to Mark Ross.
District 59: Dianna Graves lost renomination to Andy Shamblin.
District 69: Danny Hamrick lost renomination to Keith Marple.
District 74: Guy Ward lost renomination to Mike DeVault.
District 89: Ruth Rowan lost renomination to Darren Thorne.
District 90: Ken Reed lost renomination to fellow incumbent George A. Miller in a redistricting race.

In general elections

Democrats 

 District 3: Phillip DiSerio lost re-election to Jimmy Willis.
 District 7: Lisa Zukoff lost re-election to Charles Sheedy.
 District 36: Ed Evans lost re-election to Anita Hall.
 District 67: Cody Thompson lost re-election to Elias Coop-Gonzalez

Republicans 

 District 50: Austin Haynes lost re-election to David Pritt.
 District 56: Andrew Anderson lost election to incumbent Kayla Young.

List of districts

District 1 
Incumbent Pat McGeehan was first elected in 2014.

General Election

District 2 
Incumbent Mark Zatezalo was first elected in 2014, left the House of Delegates in 2018, and was elected again in 2020.

General Election

District 3 
Incumbent Phillip Diserio was first elected in 2012, left the House of Delegates in 2014, and was elected again in 2016.

General Election

District 4 
Incumbent Erikka Storch was first elected in 2010.

General Election

District 5 
Incumbent Shawn Fluharty was first elected in 2014.

General Election

District 6 
Incumbent Charlie Reynolds was first elected in 2020.

General Election

District 7 
Incumbent Lisa Zukoff was first elected in 2018.

General Election

District 8 
Incumbent David Kelly was first elected in 2018.

General Election

District 9 
Incumbent Trenton Barnhart was appointed in 2019.

General Election

District 10 
Incumbent William Anderson was first elected in 1992.

General Election

District 11 
Incumbent Roger Conley was first elected in 2020. Conley lost the Republican primary to Bob Fehrenbacher.

General Election

District 12 
Incumbent Vernon Criss was first elected in 2016.

General Election

District 13

General Election

District 14 
Incumbent Shannon Kimes was first elected in 2020. Kimes lost the Republican primary to Dave Foggin.

General Election

District 15 
Incumbent Riley Keaton was first elected in 2020.

General Election

District 16 
Incumbent Steve Westfall was first elected in 2012.

General Election

District 17 
Incumbent Jonathan Pinson was first elected in 2020.

General Election

District 18 
Incumbent Johnnie Wamsley was first elected in 2020. Wamsley lost the Republican primary to Jim Butler.

General Election

District 19 
Incumbent Kathie Hess Crouse was appointed in 2021.

General Election

District 20 
Incumbent Geoff Foster was first elected in 2014.

General Election

District 21 
Incumbent Jarred Cannon was appointed to fill the vacancy left by Joe Jeffries' resignation in June 2022, one month after Cannon won the Republican primary for District 21.

General Election

District 22 
Incumbent Daniel Linville was first elected in 2020.

General Election

District 23 
Incumbent Evan Worrell was first elected in 2018.

District 24

General Election

District 25 
Incumbent Sean Hornbuckle was first elected in 2014.

General Election

District 26 
Incumbent Matthew Rohrbach was first elected in 2014.

General Election

District 27 
Incumbent Chad Lovejoy was elected in 2016. Incumbent Ric Griffith was elected in 2020. Griffith defeated Lovejoy in the Democratic primary caused by redistricting.

General Election

District 28 
Incumbent Josh Booth was appointed in 2021. Booth lost the Republican primary to Mark Ross.

General Election

District 29

General Election

District 30

General Election

District 31 
Incumbent Margitta Mazzocchi was first elected in 2020.

General Election

District 32 
Incumbent Josh Holstein was first elected in 2020.

General Election

District 33 
Incumbent Jordan Bridges was first elected in 2020.

District 34 
Incumbent Mark Dean was first elected in 2016.

General Election

District 35

General Election

District 36 
Incumbent Ed Evans was first elected in 2016.

In the close District 36 Republican primary, Tom Acosta, who held a one vote lead in election night returns, was defeated by the same margin by Anita Hall after canvassing.

General Election

District 37 
Incumbent Marty Gearheart was first elected in 2020.

General Election

District 38 
Incumbent Joe Ellington was first elected in 2010.

General Election

District 39 
Incumbent Doug Smith was first elected in 2020.

General Election

District 40 
Incumbent Roy Cooper was first elected in 2012.

General Election

District 41 
Incumbent Jordan Maynor was appointed in 2021.

General Election

District 42 
Incumbent Brandon Steele was first elected in 2018.

General Election

District 43 
Incumbent Christopher Toney was first elected in 2018.

General Election

District 44

General Election

District 45

General Election

District 46 
Incumbent Michael Honaker was appointed in 2021.

General Election

District 47 
Incumbent Todd Longanacre was first elected in 2020.

General Election

District 48 
Incumbent Caleb Hanna was first elected in 2018.

General Election

District 49 
Incumbent Heather Tully was first elected in 2020.

General Election

District 50 
Incumbent Austin Haynes was first elected in 2020.

General Election

District 51 
Incumbent Tom Fast was first elected in 2020.

General Election

District 52 
Incumbent Larry Rowe was first elected in 1996, before leaving the chamber and returning in 2014.

General Election

District 53 
Incumbents Jim Barach and Chris Pritt were first elected in 2020. After winning the Democratic primary, Barach chose not to seek re-election, and he was replaced by Wayne Crozier.

General Election

District 54 
Incumbent Mike Pushkin was first elected in 2014.

General Election

District 55 
Incumbent Moore Capito, son of United States senator Shelley Moore Capito, was first elected in 2016.

District 56 
Incumbents Kayla Young was first elected in 2020. In 2022, incumbent Larry Pack, running against Young in the general election, resigned from the House of Delegates. His successor, Andrew Anderson, will replace him as the Republican nominee for District 56.

General Election

District 57 
Incumbent Doug Skaff was first elected in 2018.

General Election

District 58

General Election

District 59 
Incumbent Dianna Graves was appointed in 2017. Graves lost the Republican primary to Andy Shamblin.

General Election

District 60 
Incumbent Dana Ferrell was first elected in 2020.

General Election

District 61 
Incumbent Dean Jeffries was first elected in 2018.

General Election

District 62 
Incumbent Roger Hanshaw was first elected in 2014.

District 63

General Election

District 64 
Incumbent Adam Burkhammer was first elected in 2020.

General Election

District 65 
Incumbent Carl Martin was first elected in 2018.

District 66 
Incumbent Ty Nestor was first elected in 2020.

General Election

District 67 
Incumbent Cody Thompson was first elected in 2018.

General Election

District 68 
Incumbent Chris Phillips was first elected in 2018.

General Election

District 69 
Incumbent Danny Hamrick was first elected in 2012. Harmick lost the Republican primary to Keith Marple.

General Election

District 70

General Election

District 71 
Incumbent Laura Kimble was first elected in 2020.

General Election

District 72 
Incumbent Clay Riley was first elected in 2020.

General Election

District 73 
Incumbent Amy Summers was first elected in 2014.

General Election

District 74 
Incumbent Guy Ward was first elected in 2020. Ward lost the Republican primary to Mike DeVault.

General Election

District 75 
Incumbent Phil Mallow was first elected in 2020.

General Election

District 76 
Incumbent Joey Garcia was first elected in 2020.

General Election

District 77 
Incumbent Joe Statler was first elected in 2020.

General Election

District 78

General Election

District 79 
Incumbent Evan Hansen was first elected in 2018.

General Election

District 80 
Incumbent John Williams was first elected in 2016.

General Election

District 81 
Incumbent Danielle Walker was first elected in 2018.

General Election

District 82

General Election

District 83

General Election

District 84 
Incumbent D. Rolland Jennings was appointed in 2017.

General Election

District 85 
Incumbent John Paul Hott was first elected in 2018.

General Election

District 86 
Incumbent Bryan Ward was first elected in 2020.

General Election

District 87 
Incumbent Gary Howell was first elected in 2010.

General Election

District 88

General Election

District 89 
Incumbent Ruth Rowan was first elected in 2004. Rowan's son-in-law, Robert Wolford, filed to run as an independent following her loss to Darren Thorne in the Republican primary.

General Election

District 90 
Incumbents George Miller and Ken Reed were first elected in 2020. Miller defeated Reed in the Republican primary caused by redistricting.

General Election

District 91 
Incumbent Don Forsht was first elected in 2020.

General Election

District 92

General Election

District 93

General Election

District 94

General Election

District 95 
Incumbent Chuck Horst was first elected in 2020.

General Election

District 96 
Incumbent Eric Householder was first elected in 2010.

General Election

District 97 
Incumbent John Hardy was first elected in 2018.

General Election

District 98 
Incumbent Paul Espinosa was first elected in 2012.

General Election

District 99 
Incumbent Wayne Clark was first elected in 2020.

General Election

District 100

General Election

Notes

References 

House of Delegates
West Virginia House
West Virginia House of Delegates elections